Wang Guozhen (22 June 1956 – 26 April 2015) was a Chinese poet.

Biography
Wang was born in Beijing on June 22, 1956, with his ancestral home in Xiamen, Fujian. After middle school, he worked at the Fourth Optical Instrument Factory of Beijing. After the Cultural Revolution, he graduated from Jinan University in 1982, majoring in Chinese literature. After college, he was assigned to China Art Research Institute, and later became a deputy director of Chinese Art Yearbook.

Wang started to publish works in 1984, his first poem, I Smile To Live, was published in the Young People.

Wang was a regular contributor for Liaoning Youth, China Youth, and Girlfriend since 1990.

On May 21, 1990, his first poetry, Young Tide, was published by Beijing Xueyuan Publishing House.

On June 1, 2013, his poetry, Top Modern Chinese Poems: Wang Guozhen's 80 Poems in English Verse, was translated into English and published by Tsinghua University.

On April 26, 2015, Wang died of liver cancer in Beijing.

Poetry
 Top Modern Chinese Poema: Wang Guozhen's 80 Poems in English Verse
 Journey
 Going the Distance
 If You Are Unhappy
 Love Life
 Young Tide
 The Distance Is Far and The Mountain Is High
 If Life Ain't Generous Enough
 Beyond Yourself
 If Your Talent Is Not Acknowledged

References

External links

1956 births
Poets from Beijing
People from Xiamen
2015 deaths
Jinan University alumni
Deaths from liver cancer
Deaths from cancer in the People's Republic of China
Chinese male writers
Male poets
20th-century Chinese poets
21st-century Chinese poets